The NBBF National Division One, known as the Total Division One per sponsorship, is the second level basketball league in Nigeria. In 2021, the league consisted of 18 teams divided over two conferences (Savannah and Atlantic). The champions of each season are promoted to the Nigerian Premier League.

The league is named after Total, who in 2018 signed a sponsorship agreement until 2025.

Teams 
The following teams played in the 2021 season:

Savannah Conference

Atlantic Conference

Champions

References 

2
Basketball leagues in Africa